Hung may refer to:

People
 Hung (surname), various Chinese surnames
 Hùng king, a king of Vietnam

People with the given name Hung include:
 Hung Huynh, Vietnamese-American chef, winner of the third season of the television show Top Chef
 Hung Pham (born 1963), Vietnamese-Canadian former politician
 Hung Cheng, professor of Applied Mathematics

Entertainment
 Hung, a 1970 novel by Dean Koontz (published under the name Leonard Chris)

Film and television
 Hung, a short film by Guinevere Turner
 Hung (TV series), aired on HBO

Songs
 "Hung", by Napalm Death
 "Hung", by Wire from the album Mind Hive

Other
 Hung language, a Viet-Muong language spoken in Laos
 Hang (instrument), a musical instrument whose name is pronounced "hung"
 Old Hungarian alphabet (ISO 15924 script code: Hung)
 A term for possessing a large human penis size

See also

Hang (disambiguation)